Cécile Locatelli (born 12 November 1970) is a French football player who played as Defender for French club  Lyon of the Division 1 Féminine.

International career

Cécile Locatelli represented France 46 times. She was also part of the French team at the 1997 European Championships.

Coaching career

Since retiring from professional football Locatelli has become the coach of the France women's national under-17 football team.

Honours

Official
 Division 1 Féminine (Champions of France) (level 1)
Winners (3): 1992–93, 1994–95, 1997–98

References

1970 births
Living people
People from Grenoble
French people of Italian descent
French women's footballers
France women's international footballers
Olympique Lyonnais Féminin players
Women's association football defenders
Division 1 Féminine players
Women's association football managers
Female association football managers